Avianca Group International Limited (formerly Avianca Holdings S.A. and AviancaTaca Holding Inc.) is a pan-regional Latin American multinational airline holding company with its registered office in St Albans, England, and its global headquarters in Bogotá, Colombia. It was formed in February 2010 after a merger agreement between Avianca and TACA Airlines, the flag carriers of Colombia and El Salvador respectively, when Avianca and TACA became wholly owned subsidiaries of Avianca Holdings. TACA Airlines shareholders were given 29% and Avianca Airlines shareholders were given 71% of the shares in the new company.

The company was previously listed on the New York Stock Exchange and the Colombia Stock Exchange as Avianca Holdings. Since its inception, the Avianca Group has expanded its portfolio of operations and brands with the acquisition of the Mexican AeroUnion in 2014. The Group also owns the Avianca Express brand and LifeMiles, the Avianca rewards program.

Operations

The company is the second largest airline holding in Latin America by revenue and fleet size after LATAM Airlines Group based in Santiago, Chile. With a fleet of 173 aircraft and more than 19,000 employees, Avianca serves over 100 destinations in America and Europe, which connect to over 750 destinations worldwide through codeshare agreements with partner airlines. Avianca carried 24.6 million passengers in 2013.

Paradise Papers
On November 5, 2017, the Paradise Papers, a set of confidential electronic documents relating to offshore investment, revealed that the company's former Chairman Germán Efromovich was linked to an offshore conglomerate used for the aerocommercial holding business with ramifications in Bermuda, Panama and Cyprus. Efromovich used a Panamanian offshore that hid more than 20 firms located in tax havens. The conglomerate was used by Avianca Holdings in the purchase of MacAir Jet, now Avianca Argentina, aircraft company owned by Macri Group, for an amount of US$10 million. Allowing Avianca to make headway in the low-cost carrier business in Argentina. The Argentine government accepted these offshores as a financial guarantee to assign air routes to Avianca which is now being investigated by the Argentine federal justice system.

Bankruptcy
On May 10, 2020, Avianca filed for Chapter 11 bankruptcy in the United States after failing to pay bond holders, becoming one of the major airlines to file for bankruptcy due to the COVID-19 pandemic crisis.

In November 2020, the U.S. Bankruptcy Court for the Southern District of New York approved its $2 billion refinancing plan.

In November 2021, Avianca Holdings announced they would move their legal address from Panama to the United Kingdom, and that they would change their name to Avianca Group. On December 1, 2021, Avianca emerged from Chapter 11 bankruptcy for the second time in its history.

Shareholding
Shareholding composition of Avianca Holding S.A. as of March 31, 2021:
 BRW Aviation LLC – 51.53 %
 Kingsland Holdings Limited – 14.46 %
 United Airlines – less than 1%
 Avianca Holdings S.A – 15.64 %
 Several pension funds plus numerous individual investors, mostly Colombian and others – 17.37%

Subsidiaries

Current
Avianca
Avianca Cargo
AeroUnion
Helicol
PAS - Petroleum Aviation and Services
Avianca Costa Rica
Avianca Ecuador
Avianca El Salvador
Avianca Express
Avianca Guatemala
Avianca Honduras (dormant)

Former
Aeroperlas
Avianca Perú
La Costeña (active independently)
Sansa Airlines (active independently)
VIP Ecuador

See also
List of airline holding companies

References

Airline holding companies
Avianca
Holding companies of Colombia
Companies based in Bogotá
Companies that filed for Chapter 11 bankruptcy in 2020
Holding companies established in 2010
Airlines established in 2010
Colombian brands
Companies listed on the Colombia Stock Exchange
Companies formerly listed on the New York Stock Exchange
Colombian companies established in 2010